XHZPL-FM is a radio station in La Paz, Baja California Sur.

References

Radio stations in La Paz, Baja California Sur